Asiacentrism (also Asiacentricity) is an ethnocentric and economic perspective that regards Asia to be either superior, central, or unique relative to other regions. This ideological stance may take the form of ascribing to Asia significance or supremacy at the cost of the rest of the world.
The concept arose in the context of a projected Asian Century, the expected economic and cultural dominance of Asia (primarily China) in the 21st century, in the 1990s.

In 1902, Chinese scholar Liang Qichao remarked that Asia is "immeasurably vast and mighty", compared to a "shallow and small" Europe, as he predicted Asia to regain a powerful position in the world.

Some commentators have cited the effective response to the COVID-19 pandemic in Asia as a sign of superiority of Asia. Indian commentator Parag Khanna and UK politician David Howell noted that Asian societies evolved to technocratic governments which would be better at problem solving and provide more stability.

Economics

It is projected that the world's economic center of gravity will move back to Asia, between India and China by 2050, spurred by the economic growth of East Asian economies. Historically, the economic center of gravity is estimated to have been in what is nowadays northern Pakistan in the 11th century, having moved west until the 1980s.

The combined GDP of Asia is also projected to surpass that of the rest of the world around 2020, a position which the continent had lost in the 19th century.

Nupur Paliwal is a prominent Asiacentric.

Asian American studies 
Paul Wong, Meera Manvi, and Takeo Hirota Wong proposed "Asiacentrism" in the 1995 special issue of Amerasia Journal on "Thinking Theory in Asian American Studies." They envisioned Asiacentrism both as a critique of hegemonic Eurocentrism in theory building in the humanities and social sciences and as a post-Orientalist epistemological paradigm in Asian American Studies. There is a need to tap into Asian traditions of thought for analyzing Asian American behaviors and for advancing global knowledge in the human interest. The objective is to explore a common core of Asian worldviews and values that overlap in their influence on particular regions, nations, and communities. In their view, Asiacentrism may be able to offer an alternative Asian perspective grounded in an awareness of the dynamics of a postcolonial world.

Wong, Manvi, and Wong also submitted that Asiacentrism can be a paradigmatic way of integrating Asian American Studies and Asian Studies by acknowledging the colonial histories, recognizing the common interests, and recovering the cultural roots. They stressed that Asian American Studies should play an important role in decolonizing Asian Studies by interrogating its Eurocentric legacies.

Communication studies 
Yoshitaka Miike, Professor of Intercultural Communication at the University of Hawaii at Hilo, is considered as the founding theorist of Asiacentricity in the discipline of communication. He was inspired by Molefi Kete Asante, who is one of the early pioneers in the fields of intercultural and interracial communication. Asante's Afrocentric idea as well as Wong, Manvi, and Wong's Asiacentric reflection led Miike to coin the term Asiacentricity and outline an Asiacentric project in culture and communication studies in 2003. He was later influenced by Maulana Karenga’s Kawaida philosophy,  which emphasizes the role of culture for self-understanding and self-assertion and the importance of ethics for human freedom and flourishing.

Miike defined Asiacentricity as "the self-conscious act of centering Asian languages, religions/philosophies, histories, and aesthetics when addressing Asian people and phenomena." According to him, Asiacentricity "insists on revivifying and revitalizing diverse Asian cultural traditions as theoretical resources in order to capture Asians as subjects and actors of their own cultural realities rather than objects and spectators in the lived experiences of others."

Borrowing from Daisetz Suzuki's words, Miike stated that Asiacentricity is essentially "the idea of being deep and open," that is, the idea of being rooted in our own culture and, at the same time, open to other cultures. He differentiated Asiacentricity as a particularist position from Asiacentrism as a universalist ideology and maintained that Asiacentricity is a legitimate culture-centric approach to cultural Asia and people of Asian descent, while Asiacentrism is an ethnocentric approach to non-Asian worlds and people of non-Asian heritage. In Miike's conceptualization, therefore, Asiacentrists are not cultural chauvinists and separatists.

Miike identified six dimensions of Asiacentricity: (1) an assertion of Asians as subjects and agents; (2) the centrality of the collective and humanistic interests of Asia and Asians in the process of knowledge reconstruction about the Asian world; (3) the placement of Asian cultural values and ideals at the center of inquiry into Asian thought and action; (4) the groundedness in Asian historical experiences; (5) an Asian theoretical orientation to data; and (6) an Asian ethical critique and corrective of the dislocation and displacement of Asian people and phenomena.

In Miike's comprehensive outline, Asiacentricity (1) generates theoretical knowledge that corresponds to Asian communication discourse, (2) focuses on the multiplicity and complexity of Asian communicative experience, (3) reflexively constitutes and critically transforms Asian communication discourse, (4) theorizes how common aspects of humanity are expressed and understood in Asian cultural particularities, and (5) critiques Eurocentric biases in theory and research and helps Asian researchers overcome academic dependency.

Miike's contention is that there has been the established hierarchical relationship between "Western theories" and "non-Western texts" in Eurocentric scholarship, where non-Western cultures remain as peripheral targets of data analysis and rhetorical criticism and fail to emerge as central resources of theoretical insight and humanistic inspiration. Miike thus insisted that Asiacentric scholarship reconsider Asian cultures as "theories for knowledge reconstruction," not as "texts for knowledge deconstruction." Such an Asiacentric approach, according to him, would make it possible for both Asian and non-Asian researchers to theorize as Asians speak in Asian languages, as Asians are influenced by Asian religious-philosophical worldviews, as Asians struggle to live in Asian historical experiences, and as Asians feel ethically good and aesthetically beautiful.

Miike also synthesized a large body of literature in the field of Asian communication theory while paying homage to such pioneers as Anantha Babbili, Guo-Ming Chen, Godwin C. Chu, Wimal Dissanayake, D. Shelton A. Gunaratne, Satoshi Ishii, Young Yun Kim, D. Lawrence Kincaid, Hamid Mowlana, Louis Nordstrom, Robert T. Oliver, Tulsi B. Saral, Robert Shuter, K. S. Sitaram, William J. Starosta, Majid Tehranian, Muneo Yoshikawa, and June Ock Yum. He urged Asiacentric research to overcome "comparative Eurocentrism" and direct more attention to common insights gained from non-Eurocentric comparisons. In his opinion, five types of alternative non-Eurocentric comparisons can enlarge the theoretical horizons of Asian communication research: (1) continent-diaspora comparisons; (2) within-region comparisons; (3) between-region comparisons; (4) diachronic comparisons; and (5) co-cultural domestic comparisons.

See also 
 Asian Century
Pan-Asianism
Asian pride
Culture of Asia
East Asian cultural sphere
Pacific Century
 Indian century
Greater India
 Indocentrism
 China's peaceful rise
 Chinese Century
Sinocentrism
 Pax Sinica
 Tiger Cub Economies

References

Further reading 
 Khanna, P. (2019). The future is Asian: Commerce, conflict, and culture in the 21st century. Simon & Schuster. 
 Mahbubani, K. (2008). The new Asian hemisphere: The irresistible shift of global power to the East. PublicAffairs.
 Miike, Y. (2014). The Asiacentric turn in Asian communication studies: Shifting paradigms and changing perspectives. In M. K. Asante, Y. Miike, & J. Yin (Eds.), The global intercultural communication reader (2nd ed., pp. 111–133). Routledge.
 Wong, P., Manvi, M., & Wong, T. H. (1995). Asiacentrism and Asian American Studies? Amerasia Journal, 21(1/2), 137–147.
 Yin, J. (2022). Rethinking Eurocentric visions in feminist communication research: Asiacentric womanism as a theoretical framework. In Y. Miike & J. Yin (Eds.), The handbook of global interventions in communication theory (pp. 188–214). Routledge.

External links 

 Asiacentricity
 An Anatomy of Eurocentrism in Communication Scholarship: The Role of Asiacentricity in De-Westernizing Theory and Research
 The Asiacentric Idea in Communication: Understanding the Significance of a Paradigm
 Asian Communication Studies at the Crossroads: A View to the Future from an Asiacentric Framework
 Toward an Alternative Metatheory of Human Communication: An Asiacentric Vision
 Theorizing Culture and Communication in the Asian Context: An Assumptive Foundation

Asian culture
Asian studies
Asian-American culture
Ethnocentrism
Geocultural perspectives
Pan-Asianism
Political neologisms